Arlecdon and Frizington is a civil parish in the Borough of Copeland, Cumbria, England.  It contains seven listed buildings that are recorded in the National Heritage List for England.  Of these, one is listed at Grade II*, the middle of the three grades, and the others are at Grade II, the lowest grade.  The parish contains the villages of Arlecdon, Rowrah and Frizington, and the surrounding countryside.  The oldest listed building is a medieval cross, which is also a scheduled monument.  The other listed buildings are a church and associated structures, a country house and its gate piers, and a former stable block.


Key

Buildings

References

Citations

Sources

Lists of listed buildings in Cumbria